Sulu Fitzpatrick (born 20 August 1992), also known as Sulu Tone-Fitzpatrick, is a New Zealand netball and rugby sevens player. She plays for the Northern Mystics in the ANZ Championships. She can play the Goal Keeper, Goal Defence, and Wing Defence positions. She is of Samoan heritage.

Early life and career
Sulu Tone-Fitzpatrick was born in Auckland in 1992 to Olive and Konelio Tone, but was living with her uncle Greg and aunt Rosie ever since. She is an elder sister to Theresa Fitzpatrick. She signed with the Northern Mystics for the 2010 season, while still at the St Cuthbert's College at the age of 17. She moved to the Waikato Bay of Plenty Magic for the 2011 season in a bid for more court time. After a solid season, that saw her nominated as Best Young Player, she was selected for the Silver Ferns for the 2011/12 season, in place of the injured Casey Kopua and Katrina Grant. She made her debut in the first match of a two-game series against England. She was also named captain of the NZ U21 team in a three match series against Australia, which they lost 2–1. She also made the fastnet team for the 2011 World Netball Series, where her team scored 48-27 earning her a silver medal.

In 2012, she was dropped from the squad after spending most of the season on the bench behind veteran defenders Casey Williams and Leana De Bruin, while the Magic won the premiership. She played again for the NZ U21 team.

For the 2013 season, she has again moved teams in search of court time, this time to the Southern Steel, where she will link up with her fellow U21 defenders Storm Purvis and Phoenix Karaka, as well as ex-Auckland teammate Rachel Rasmussen.

She competed for Samoa in rugby sevens at the 2015 New Zealand Women's Sevens Series.

In 2021 she captained the Auckland Mystics to win the ANZ premiership, in the 23-year history of the franchise netball in New Zealand no Auckland team had ever won the title.

At the netball awards of 2021 she won the Dame Lois Muir Supreme Award

In April 2022, Fitzpatrick  was included on a list of the 25 best players to feature in netball leagues in New Zealand since 1998.

Resignation and personal life
Sulu Tone-Fitzpatrick is a mother to twins Tevita and Theresa, the latter of whom was named in honour of her sister. The twins were born on Boxing Day, and after it, Tone-Fitzpatrick resigned from her netball career.

Fitzpatrick has a Malu to honour her late grandfather 

Fitzpatrick has been open about her alcohol and Mental Health issues.

References

New Zealand netball players
Northern Stars players
Southern Steel players
Waikato Bay of Plenty Magic players
Northern Mystics players
ANZ Championship players
1992 births
Living people
Female rugby sevens players
Samoa international rugby sevens players
University of Auckland alumni
Central Pulse players
New Zealand international Fast5 players
New Zealand international netball players
Commonwealth Games medallists in netball
Commonwealth Games bronze medallists for New Zealand
Netball players at the 2022 Commonwealth Games
Medallists at the 2022 Commonwealth Games